Priit Kolsar (stage name Cool D; born 23 October 1973 in Tartu) is an Estonian hip hop musician.

Cool D has won several awards in Estonian Music Awards. In 2005 and 2006, he was named as "best male artist of the year".

Discography

Albums
1995 – "O'culo"
1996 – "Sõnumid pimedusest"
1998 – "Saaga läheb edasi"
1999 – "Pahade planeet"
2001 – "Räpased riimid"
2004 – "Seenioride vabakava"
2005 – "Tütar üksi kodus"
2009 – "Cool FM"
2012 – "Tumeaine"

References

Estonian musicians
Living people
1973 births